Donie O'Sullivan (born ) is an Irish journalist working for CNN in New York.

Early life 
Originally from Cahersiveen in County Kerry, O'Sullivan attended Coláiste na Sceilge, graduating in 2009. He graduated from University College Dublin in 2012 with a degree in history and politics, and has a masters in political science from Queen's University Belfast. He worked for Storyful in Dublin and New York, before joining CNN in 2016.

CNN (2016–present) 
He has covered the impact of social media on politics and reported on the 2021 United States Capitol attack. In 2021, O'Sullivan's work on a story about a COVID-19 "patient-zero conspiracy theory" (broadcast by CNN in 2020) was nominated for a News & Documentary Emmy Award. Donie O'Sullivan: Capitol Man, a documentary covering O'Sullivan's own life and move from "a small town in Kerry to become an international household name", was commissioned by RTÉ Television, and broadcast in Ireland in January 2022.

In December 2022, O'Sullivan's Twitter account was among several journalist's accounts that got suspended after covering Twitter's owner Elon Musk during the December 15, 2022 Twitter suspensions. Musk accused O’Sullivan of violating Twitter’s policy on doxing.

References

External links
 on the Fediverse

Living people
CNN people
Irish expatriates in the United States
Irish journalists
People from Cahersiveen
Year of birth missing (living people)